L. Puster and Company Furniture Manufactory is a historic furniture factory building located in downtown Evansville, Indiana. It was built in 1887, and is a four-story, brick building.

It was listed on the National Register of Historic Places in 1982.

References

Industrial buildings and structures on the National Register of Historic Places in Indiana
Industrial buildings completed in 1887
Buildings and structures in Evansville, Indiana
National Register of Historic Places in Evansville, Indiana